Henrique Miranda may refer to:

 Henrique Miranda (footballer) (born 1993), Brazilian footballer
 Henrique Miranda (water polo) (born 1986), Brazilian water polo player